Dil Jaise Dhadke... Dhadakne Do (The Way The Heart Beats... Let It Beat) is an Indian television series which premiered on 10 February 2020 on Star Plus. Created by Mahesh Bhatt and produced by Guroudev Bhalla, it starred Javed Savaille, Hirva Trivedi, Rahil Azam and Shruti Seth. It was indefinitely halted on 27 March 2020 owing COVID-19 outbreak after the shootings were stalled. However, in May 2020 it was reported to not return post-lockdown being cancelled mid-way by the channel due to low ratings.

Plot
An innocent and silent 7 year old girl Iti has become speechless and numb after losing her mother in a fire accident one year ago. Yug is a charming young boy who crosses path with Iti. He tries to make her smile and speak again while they become best friends.

Shivraj, a renowned doctor, who has sacrificed the worldly pleasures and became renowned after a past accident, and is now known as Devguru, keenly searches for the Devi whom he considers would save the world from evil and sin. After a lot of efforts Devguru finds Devi in Iti, and wants to make her Devi. But his attempts are failed by who Yug, who has sworn to protect Iti and keep her happy.

Cast

Main
 Hirva Trivedi as Iti Rai
 Jared Savaille as Yug Gautam
 Rahil Azam as Dr. Shivraj Singh / Devguru 
 Shruti Seth as Bhavini Mishra: Devguru's assistant
 Archana Singh as Savita

Recurring
 Piyali Munshi as Sadhna Rai– Pankaj's wife; Iti's mother
 Sandeep Baswana as Pankaj Rai: Iti's father
 Himangi Kavi as Shanti Gautam: Diya and Yug's mother 
 Nandini Maurya as Diya Gautam: Shanti's daughter, Yug's sister
 Himmanshoo A. Malhotra as Dr. Sanjay: Shivraj's best friend, Aparna's brother
 Achal Tankwal as Raju 
 Tanishq Seth as Komal
 Payash Jain as Om Rai: Iti's cousin, Savita's son
 Sanket Choukse as Abeer: Bhavini's lover

Production

Development
Initially titled Jannat, it was later renamed Dil Jaise Dhadke... Dhadakne Do.

The show is created by film maker Mahesh Bhatt. Talking about the show, he said, "Our show is basically questioning the narrative that is prevalent among men – to be treated separately. There is a man who believes that this child is a vehicle for the goddess to step into the world. On the other hand, the young compassionate boy says she is just my friend, and no Devi. This is the pitch where the battle takes place".

Cancellation
Owing Covid-19 outbreak, the shootings were stalled since 19 March 2020 and the series telecast was halted midway on 27 March 2020 and was to resume shoot after the lockdown ends. However, in May 2020 it was confirmed to not return, being axed by the channel as it had earlier garnered low ratings. Because of it Rajveer Singh and Ashi Singh who were supposed to enter the series as Yug and Iti after a leap in story planned on end of March 2020 was not possible.

Reception
The series had a very low ratings with a television rating point (trp) between 0.6 and 0.8 in urban.

References

External links
 Dil Jaise Dhadke... Dhadakne Do on Hotstar

StarPlus original programming
Hindi-language television shows
Indian television soap operas
Indian drama television series
Television shows set in Mumbai
2020 Indian television series debuts
2020 Indian television series endings